The Mission is a 1983 American drama film directed by and starring Parviz Sayyad. It was entered into the 33rd Berlin International Film Festival.

Plot

Cast 
 Parviz Sayyad as The Colonel
 Mary Apick as Maliheh
 Houshang Touzie as Agent From Teheran
 Saeed Rajai as Agent From Teheran
 Kamran Nozad as Ghaffar
 Mohammed Ghaffari as His Eminence
 Hatam Anvar as Maziar
 Hedia Anvar as Farzaneh
 Soraya Shayesteh as The Woman
 Richard Mansfield as Mugger
 David Filinni as Mugger

References

External links 
 

1983 films
1983 drama films
American drama films
1980s Persian-language films
Films directed by Parviz Sayyad
1980s English-language films
1983 multilingual films
American multilingual films
1980s American films